Rassolnik is a traditional Russian soup made from pickled cucumbers, pearl barley, and pork or beef kidneys. A vegetarian variant of rassolnik also exists, usually made during Lent. The dish is known to have existed as far back as the 15th century, when it was called kalya. Rassolnik became part of the common Soviet cuisine and today it is also popular in Ukraine and Belarus. A similar dish is common in Poland, where it is known as zupa ogórkowa (literally cucumber soup).

The key part of rassolnik is the rassol, a liquid based on the juice of pickled cucumbers with various other seasonings. It is a favourite hangover treatment.

See also 

 Borshch
 Shchi
 Solyanka
 List of Russian dishes
 List of soups

References 

Russian soups
Ukrainian soups
Soviet cuisine
Vegetable soups